Farzana (born Farzana Barucha in Mumbai, Maharashtra, India) is an  Indian actress, dance choreographer, and model. As an actress, she predominantly worked in Telugu films, notable among them being Bhagyalakshmi Bumper Draw (2006), Seema Sastri (2007), and Bommana Brothers Chandana Sisters (2008).

Early life 
Farzana is born and brought up in Mumbai in a Parsi family.

Professional career
Farzana started her career as a professional dancer and choreographer. She has done choreography for many fashion shows and albums. As a choreographer, she worked with the stage shows of Adnan Sami. Her most notable choreography was for the title song of the 2006 Sanjay Dutt movie Zinda. Later on she became a professional model for brands including Hero Honda, Sansui, Godrej Hair Care, and Big Bazaar.

She was spotted by director Nidhi Prasad who signed her for a lead role in his movie Bhagyalakshmi Bumper Draw (2006), which was the Telugu remake of the Bollywood comedy film Malamaal Weekly (2006) written and directed by Priyadarshan. Having started a career in a comic movie she was typecast as a comedy film heroine.

Farzana has played the lead role in movies like Seema Sastri (2007), Bommana Brothers Chandana Sisters (2008), Gajibiji (2008), and Kuberulu (2008) all of which were comedy movies. She danced in the movie Mallepuvvu (2008) starring Muralikrishna and Bhumika Chawla.

In 2009 she entered the Tamil film industry and played the lead role in the film 1977 starring Sarath Kumar and Namitha.

Farzana is a nutrition expert, and enjoys adventure sports like paragliding, rock climbing and bungee jumping. She was a trainer for the sportswear company Reebok International Limited.

Filmography

Choreography

References

External links

Actresses in Telugu cinema
Year of birth missing (living people)
Living people
Actresses from Mumbai
21st-century Indian actresses
Indian film actresses
Actresses in Tamil cinema
Parsi people